A family office is a privately held company that handles  investment management and wealth management for a wealthy family, generally one with at least $50-$100 million in investable assets, with the goal being to effectively grow and transfer wealth across generations. The company's financial capital is the family's own wealth. Family offices also may handle tasks such as managing household staff, making travel arrangements, property management, day-to-day accounting and payroll activities, management of legal affairs, family management services, family governance, financial and investor education, coordination of philanthropy and private foundations, and succession planning. A family office can cost over $1 million a year to operate, so the family's net worth usually exceeds $50-$100 million in investable assets. Some family offices accept investments from people who are not members of the owning family. Some firms that cater to multiple clients offer personality psychology services for family members to support better alignment and communications among members of the family.

A family office either is, or operates just like, a corporation or limited liability company, with officers and a support staff. Officers are compensated per their arrangement with the family, usually with incentives based on the profits or capital gains generated by the office. Family offices are often built around core assets that are professionally managed. As profits are created, assets are deployed into investments. Family offices might invest in private equity, venture capital opportunities, hedge funds, and commercial real estate. Many family offices turn to hedge funds for alignment of interest based on risk and return assessment goals. Some family offices remain passive and just allocate funds to outside managers.

History
The firm DuPont, after founder Irenee died in 1834 was conceived as a kind of family office, where three of his sons split management duties of their late father's gunpowder mill. The Rockefeller family first pioneered family offices in  the late 19th century. Family offices started gaining popularity in the 1980s, and since 2005, as the ranks of the super-rich grew to record proportions family offices swelled proportionately.

In 2007, the case of the Ayer family office highlighted family office risk when a "family confidant allegedly siphoned about $58 million away in a few years."

Under the Dodd–Frank Wall Street Reform and Consumer Protection Act of 2010, an organized effort was undertaken by single family offices (SFOs) nationwide led by the Private Investor Coalition that successfully convinced Congress to exempt SFOs from having to meet certain criteria from the definition of investment adviser under the Investment Advisers Act of 1940. Previously, such family offices were deemed to be investment advisers and relied on the "less than 15 clients" rule to avoid registration under the Act, a rule that was eliminated under Dodd-Frank. The Obama U.S. Securities and Exchange Commission under chair Mary Schapiro promulgated the final "family office rules" on June 22, 2011, after hearing from around 100 family offices through their attorneys, who invoked solicitor-client privilege in the communications with the SEC. In the words of one solicitor: "The extended family that controls the family office has asked this firm to provide the Commission with comments to the Proposed Rule on its behalf, as it believes that providing comments directly to the Commission might compromise its privacy, including publicly revealing the manner by which it conducts its family office business."

Family offices became more common in years since 2010 after the rapid increase in valuations of technology companies led to many people having newly created wealth. Also in 2010, the academic Journal of Family Business Strategy was launched by Torsten Pieper to "publish research that contributes new knowledge and understanding to the field of family business."

According to a 2015 report by the Financial Times, the label "family office" was increasingly replaced by other business names, such as "private investment office", with services in relation therewith called "private company services" or "strategic philanthropy advice". Globally in 2015, one source numbered 79,000 families that controlled roughly $19 trillion in assets.

In January 2021, it was revealed that Leon Black paid Jeffrey Epstein $158 million over the period from 2012 to 2017 for family office tax advice.

In spring 2021 the implosion of Archegos Capital Management drew the scrutiny of several regulators and the questioning of Sherrod Brown, Chair of the US Senate Banking Committee. It came to light during the 2021 implosion of Archegos Capital Management that family offices were reportedly "more loosely regulated than other investment vehicles, with fewer disclosure requirements." In response to these concerns, US Representative Alexandria Ocasio-Cortez introduced The Family Office Regulation Act of 2021, H.R. 4620, which would limit the use of the family office exemption from registration as an investment advisor with the SEC to offices with $750 million or less in assets under management. The bill would also prevent persons who are barred or subject to final orders for conduct constituting fraud, manipulation or deceit from being associated with a family office. This view, however, is not shared by a number of regulators and commentators, including Commissioner Hester Peirce of the Securities and Exchange Commission (SEC) and Commissioner Brian Quintenz of the Commodity Futures Trading Commission (CFTC), who published an op-ed arguing that family offices do not need new regulations.

Traditional and modern usage
A traditional single family office is a business run by and for a single family. Its sole function is to centralize the management of a significant family fortune. Typically, these organizations employ staff to manage investments, taxes, philanthropic activities, trusts, and legal matters. The family office invests the family's money, manages all of the family's assets, and disburses payments to family members as required.

According to Spear's Wealth Management Survey in 2022, "Family offices are private companies that support a number of functions for wealthy families including the smooth running of day-to-day affairs as well as more complex matters involving wealth management and strategy. These issues are particularly important for families with assets and interests in multiple jurisdictions."

In June 2008, Wharton Magazine reported that "About 1,000 SFOs are in operation around the world catering to families with a least $100 million in assets. More than half the SFOs are managing family wealth of more than $1 billion." Services handled by the traditional SFO include investment management, property management, day-to-day accounting and payroll activities, and management of legal affairs, and they often provide family management services, which includes family governance, financial and investment education, philanthropy coordination, and succession planning. An academic investigation defined SFOs as "professional organizations dedicated to managing family wealth and family matters, represent the leading edge of a broad trend in substantial personal wealth accumulation. The worldwide concentration of wealth in the hands of relatively few is well documented. As the rich grow even richer, and particularly as fortunes filter down through generations, wealth management becomes ever more complex. It is in this context that SFOs — dedicated to the service of one multi-millionaire or billionaire family — have evolved."

Family office types
Over the past few decades, family office landscape evolved significantly. Despite different regional laws and regulations, modern family offices strive to manage the family wealth individually, which results into various organisational and governance structures. Currently, three main types of family offices are recognised:

Single family office 
These enterprises are almost always structured as stand-alone business entities. They are dedicated to managing wealth of a single family. The benefits of single family office are services that are highly tailored to families' needs and values, including legal compliance and aligned investment philosophy. On the contrary, this entity is expensive to run and is mostly suitable for families with a significant wealth.

Multi-family office 
Compared to single family offices, multi-family offices serve two or more affluent families. Although their services are not as compound, they are becoming a popular and attractive option for families and individual wealth owners with less complex needs. Many multi-family offices were eventually built on the single family office base but later started expanding and offering their services to more than just one client. Key advantage of joining multi-family office is its cost saving efficiency.

Virtual family office 
For families that are spread across geographies, virtual family office is a popular option. With the growth of family office technologies, families can efficiently work remotely while remaining a cost effective solution.

See also
 Private foundation

References

External links 
Largest Family Offices - Rankings List

Investment management
Family economics
Tax avoidance